The Ankamuti were an indigenous Australian people of the Cape York Peninsula of Queensland.

Language
The Ankamuti spoke one of the Uradhi dialects.

Country
Ankamuti territory, according to Norman Tindale, extended over some  around the western side of Cape York, as far south as Vrilya Point. Its inland extension was close to the headwaters of the Jardine River. Offshore, they were also on Possession Island and Crab Island (Queensland)
and the western islands of Endeavour Strait.

Alternative names
 Goomkoding
 Yumakundji. (perhaps a Yadhaykenu exonym)
 Amkomti
 Ondaima. (? perhaps referring to a horde)
 Oiyamkwi. (people on Red Island)
 Apukwi. (people of Crab Island).

Notes

Citations

Sources

Aboriginal peoples of Queensland